Tezer Özlü (10 September 1943 – 18 February 1986) was a Turkish writer.

Biography
She was born in Simav. She spent her childhood in Simav, Ödemiş and Gerede, where her parents worked. She moved to Istanbul when she was 10 years old. She went to the Austrian Girls' High School ( Avusturya Lisesi ); but she did not graduate. She went abroad in 1961. She toured Europe by hitchhiking in 1962-1963. She married actor and writer Güner Sümer, whom she met in Paris, in 1964. Together they settled in Ankara. During this period when Sümer was working at AST, Özlü worked as a German translator. In the 1963–64 season in AST, he played in Brendan Behan's Gizli Ordu (Secret Army), directed by Sümer. She left Sumer and settled in Istanbul. She stayed in the psychiatry clinics of different hospitals in Istanbul between 1967 and 1972, intermittently due to her illness. She wrote about her childhood experiences and the times she stayed in the clinic in the book Çocukluğun Soğuk Geceleri (published in English in 2023 as Cold Nights of Childhood). She married the director Erden Kıral in 1968. From this marriage, in 1973, her daughter Deniz was born. She went to Berlin in 1981 on a scholarship. Meanwhile, he left Kıral. She met Hans Peter Marti, a Swiss-born artist living in Canada, and married Marti in 1984 and settled in Zurich. She died there on 18 February 1986 of breast cancer. Her grave is in Aşiyan Mezarlığı. Özlü was portrayed by Yelda Reynaud in her ex-wife Erden Kıral's film Yolda, in which she tells about the events during the shooting of the movie Yol.

Bibliography
Her first book was Eski Bahçe, a collection of her stories published in magazines since 1963. The book was first published in 1978. Her first novel, Çocukluğun Soğuk Geceleri, was published in 1980. Following in the footsteps of three writers who had a profound effect on her, Svevo, Kafka and Pavese , her second novel was published in 1983 as Auf den Spuren eines Selbstmords (In Search of a Suicide). The book, which won the 1983 Marburg Literary Award, was rewritten by the author in a sense in Turkish under the name of Yaşamın Ucuna Seyahat, and was published as such in 1984. Her first story book, "Eski Bahçe", was published in 1987 with the name "Eski Bahçe - Eski Sevgi", together with the stories she wrote later, after the death of the author. Gergedan Magazine published a "photobiography" in memory of the author in its 13th issue. Some parts of her diary and narratives were brought together in a small booklet called The Remains (1990). Most of the German texts in this book were translated into Turkish by Sezer Duru. Özlü's unpublished screenplay, Zaman Dışı Yaşam, was also published in 1993 by Yapı Kredi Yayınları (YKY), which publishes all of the author's works. In this series, there is also Tezer Özlü'den Leyla Erbil'e Mektuplar (1995), which consists of the letters that the author wrote to her friend Leyla Erbil.[6] In addition, Özlü's book, "Her Şeyin Sonundayım" consisting of her correspondence with her writer friend Ferit Edgü, was published in 2010 with the label of SEL Yayıncılık. She translated Wolfgang Hildesheimer's work "Mr. Walser's Crows" into Turkish and adapted it for the radio.

Eski Bahçe (1978)
Çocukluğun Soğuk Geceleri (1980) (translated in 2023 as Cold Nights of Childhood)
Auf den Spuren eines Selbstmords (1983)
Yaşamın Ucuna Yolculuk (1984)
Eski Bahçe - Eski Sevgi (1987)
Kalanlar (1995)
Zaman Dışı Yaşam (2000).

References

1943 births
1986 deaths
People from Kütahya
20th-century Turkish women writers
20th-century Turkish writers
Turkish autobiographers
Women autobiographers
Deaths from cancer in Switzerland
Deaths from breast cancer
Burials at Aşiyan Asri Cemetery